Kanika may refer to:

People 
 Kanika (name), a common Indian given name, from Hindi or Sanskrit
 Kaniha or Kanika (born 1982), Indian film actress who works predominantly in Malayalam cinema

Other uses 
 Kaniha, Kamrup, a village in Assam in India
 Kanika Chorten, a stupa located in Sani Monastery
 Kanika Jamavar, a high end variety of Jamavar shawl
 Kanika (film), an Indian revenge/horror film
 Kanika (food), an Indian rice dish

See also 
 
 
 Kanik (disambiguation)